Wai khru ram muay is a ritual performed by participants before fighting in muay Thai competitions. 

Wai khru is a universal concept that exists in almost all of Thai performance art - from Thai traditional music to classical Khon dance and fighting arts, such as krabi krabong and Muay Thai. The wai is a traditional Thai greeting with the palms together as a sign of respect. Khru is the Thai form of the Sanskrit word guru meaning 'teacher'. Ram is the Thai word for dancing in classical style, and muay means 'boxing'. The full term can therefore be translated as 'war-dance saluting the teacher', but Thai speakers generally shorten it either to wai khru or ram muay. The ram muay shows respect and gratitude to the boxer's teacher, parents, and ancestors. In the days when boxers fought in front of the royalty, the ram muay also paid respect to the king.

Upon entering the ring, fighters circle the ring in a counter-clockwise direction and pray at each corner. They bow their heads at every corner three times in salutation to Buddha, Dharma, and the sangha of monks. They then commence the ram muay, the movements of which are said to be based on Hanuman. The ram muay is a personal ritual, ranging from the very complex to the very simple, and often contains clues about who trained the fighter and where the fighter is from. The ram muay is accompanied by music, providing a rhythm to the boxer's movements.

See also

Wai khru
Sarama (Thai music)

References

External links

The tradition of Wai khru
Article on Ram Muay

Thai culture
Muay Thai
Thai dance
Kickboxing terminology
Martial arts culture
Muay Thai culture